Sanavord (also Romanized as Sanāvord; also known as ‘Abbāsābād-e Sanāvord, Abbāsābād Sanābard, and ‘Abbāsābād Sanāvord) is a village in Enaj Rural District, Qareh Chay District, Khondab County, Markazi Province, Iran. At the 2006 census, its population was 704, in 200 families.

References 

Populated places in Khondab County